Dani Rylan Kearney (born August 5, 1987) is an American entrepreneur and former ice hockey player. She is the founder and former commissioner of the National Women's Hockey League (NWHL), the first professional women's hockey league in the United States, and the first professional women's hockey league ever to pay its players in North America. Prior to launching the league in March 2015, Rylan attempted to bring a CWHL expansion team to New York in 2014. She previously played with the Northeastern Huskies women's ice hockey program in NCAA play and was a captain in her final season.

Early life and playing career
Rylan began playing ice hockey with boys on the Tampa Bay Junior Lightning as an elementary school student. She attended boarding school at the St. Mark's School in New England and was captain of the girls' hockey team.

Prior to joining Northeastern University, Rylan played one season with the Division II club program at the Metropolitan State College of Denver, a men's team that competes in the American Collegiate Hockey Association. She earned a broadcasting journalism degree at Metro State in 2010.

Career stats

Executive career 
Rylan was inspired to create a women's league while watching the United States and Canadian national teams play in the finals of the 2014 Winter Olympics and began researching the new business opportunity. She began calling people she knew in ice hockey circles and the plans for the league began within a year. She contacted players, conducted research on markets, held training camps, created four teams, and scheduled the venues.

Since that time, the NWHL added two more teams and sparked an increased interest in women's hockey viewership and participation. In 2019, Rylan and the NWHL Players' Association agreed on a 50-50 split of revenue from all league-level partnerships — the first such deal in women's professional sports history. The 2019–20 season saw the most corporate partnerships the league has ever had. The NWHL and Twitch announced a three-year partnership in 2019 for exclusive streaming rights of all league games. During Rylan's tenure, the NWHL brought women's hockey to communities beyond the league's markets with All-Star Games held in Pittsburgh and Nashville, with the Nashville event setting the record for largest attendance for a women's professional hockey game in the United States. She also formed the Jr. NWHL, which connected the league with more than 150 youth hockey programs.

Rylan has been named to ESPN's "IMPACT 25," which recognizes the women making the biggest impact on their sport and the society in which they live, and she has been honored by Fast Company as one of the "Top 100 Most Creative People" and as a member of the magazine's Innovation Council. A passionate entrepreneur, she is a popular speaker and panelist at business and career conferences.

On October 12, 2020, Rylan stepped down as commissioner and was replaced by Tyler Tumminia as interim commissioner during a league reorganization. The league changed its governing model to an incorporated association overseen by a board of governors with one representative per team. Rylan remained with the league to oversee the Beauts, Whale, Riveters, and Whitecaps while it searched for independent ownership of the league-operated teams before resigning from that role in March 2021.

Personal life
Rylan grew up in Indian Rocks Beach, Florida. Her father worked in marketing for the Tampa Bay Lightning. After college, she moved to New York City and opened a coffee shop named Rise and Grind in East Harlem.

References

External links
 NWHL bio

1987 births
American women's ice hockey players
Northeastern University alumni
Sportspeople from Tampa, Florida
Living people
Northeastern Huskies women's ice hockey players
Premier Hockey Federation
New York Riveters
American sports businesspeople
Women in American professional sports management
Ice hockey people from Florida
Metropolitan State University of Denver alumni
Commissioners
Women ice hockey executives
American sports executives and administrators